In Greek mythology, Eupraxia (Ancient Greek: Εὐπραξίας means 'good conduct') was the personification of well-being.

Mythology 
According to Aeschylus, Eupraxia was the daughter of another two personifications, Peitharchia and Soter."When you invoke the gods, do not be ill-advised. For Peitharkhia (Obedience) is the mother of Eupraxia (Success), wife of Soter (Salvation)—as the saying goes."

Notes

References 

 Aeschylus, translated in two volumes. 1. Seven Against Thebes by Herbert Weir Smyth, Ph. D. Cambridge, MA. Harvard University Press. 1926. Online version at the Perseus Digital Library. Greek text available from the same website.

Greek goddesses
Personifications in Greek mythology